Eiríkur Benedikz (1907-1988) was an Icelandic scholar, diplomat and book collector. He left his library of around 3000 items of Icelandica to the University of Nottingham library, where it is housed among the Manuscripts and Special Collections

Works
 An anthology of Icelandic poetry, 1969.

References

External links
 Benedikz Collection of Icelandic Literature, University of Nottingham Library

1907 births
1988 deaths
Eirikur Benedikz
Eirikur Benedikz
Book and manuscript collectors
People associated with the University of Nottingham